Partizánska Ľupča (until 1945 Nemecká Ľupča) is a large village and municipality in Liptovský Mikuláš District in the Žilina Region of northern Slovakia.

Etymology 
The name Ľupča is derived from Slavic personal name with a root Ľub. Lipche/Lypche (Lipcse) are already Hungarized forms because of contemporary practice of the Royal Estate, however also these forms were sometimes again Slovakized in medieval documents (e.g. Lipcza). The etymological adjective "Nemecká" (German) Ľupča referenced to the ethnic composition of the town in the Middle Ages. After World War II it was changed to "Partizánska" (Partisan) Ľupča thanks to its active participation in the Slovak National Uprising.

History 
In historical records the village was first mentioned in 1252.

Geography 
It has a population of about 1200 people.

References

External links 
 http://www.statistics.sk/mosmis/eng/run.html

Villages and municipalities in Liptovský Mikuláš District